Completely Free  is a 1982 compilation album by the band Free. It contains all 7 singles to chart between 1970 and 1976 as well as 5 further album tracks.

Track listing
 "My Brother Jake" - 2:50
 "Wishing Well" - 3:41
 "Fire And Water" - 3:59
"I’m A Mover" - 2:55
"All Right Now" - 4:14
"Traveling Man" - 3:20
"I’ll Be Creepin’" - 2:48
"Little Bit of Love" - 2:34
"Mr. Big" - 5:55
"The Stealer" - 3:14
"The Hunter" - 4:14
"Travelin’ In Style" - 4:01

References

Free (band) compilation albums
1982 compilation albums